There's Something About Remy: Based on a True Story is the debut studio album by American rapper Remy Ma. It was released on February 7, 2006, by SRC Records, Universal Records and Terror Squad Entertainment. The album's release date served as the sixth anniversary of her mentor Big Pun's death. The title and cover art coincides with the 1998 film There's Something About Mary. The album sold over 35,000 copies in its first week  and as of 2007, has sold over 160,000 copies.

Background
While growing up with her sister Kristin Devereaux, in Castle Hill Projects in the Bronx, New York, Remy Ma often saw the consequences and terrors of her family's drug abuse with her own eyes. She was forced to take care of her little brothers and sisters at her young age and retreated from her home issues by writing poetry. Her reputation quickly grew around the Bronx and word eventually got to the late MC Big Pun of her and her work. After one meeting and a freestyle session, Pun became her mentor. Ma made her first appearances in the music industry on Big Pun's album Yeeeah Baby (under the name Remy Martin) on the tracks such as "Ms. Martin" and "You Was Wrong".

Upon the death of Big Pun, rapper Fat Joe signed Smith to his imprint label under SRC and Universal and made her a member of Terror Squad. Following the success of Lean Back, which garnered Remy a Grammy nomination, Ma released three singles from her debut album There's Something About Remy, the songs "Whuteva", "Conceited" and "Feels So Good" The album moved 40,000 units in its opening week and 160,000 units within the first year. The album received good reviews from XXL Magazine with XL to Rolling Stone and Vibe Magazine despite its low sales. Remy was frustrated at the way the album was being promoted by Universal and how the label wasn't releasing the right singles. With the solo albums lackluster debut, Smith decided to end her relationship with Fat Joe and the Terror Squad, breaking her deal with SRC/Universal in the process.

Commercial performance
Despite lack of promotion from the label, There's Something About Remy: Based On A True Story peaked at number 33 on Billboard 200, number 33 on Billboard Top Album Sales, number 2 on Billboard Top Rap Albums and number 7 on Billboard Top R&B/Hip-Hop Albums.

Singles
The album's lead single, called "Whuteva" was released on August 2, 2005. The song peaked at number 1 on Billboard Bubbling Under R&B/Hip-Hop Songs chart, number 18 on the Hot R&B/Hip-Hop Songs and number 79 on the Top R&B Songs. In December 2006, the music video was added to her Official YouTube account.

The album's second single, called "Conceited" was released on December 13, 2005. The song peaked at number 7 Billboard Hot R&B/Hip-Hop Song Recurrents chart, number 17 on the Hot Rap Tracks, number 90 on the Billboard Hot 100, number 71 on Billboard Radio Songs chart, number 24 on Billboard R&B/Hip-Hop Airplay chart, number 4 on Billboard Bubbling Under R&B/Hip-Hop Songs and number 17 on Billboard Rap Airplay chart. The music video premiered on January 7, 2006, on VH1.

The album's third single, "Feel So Good" was released on April 25, 2006. The song features a guest appearance from American singer-songwriter Ne-Yo. The song peaked at number 1 on Billboard Bubbling Under Hot 100, number 20 on the Hot R&B/Hip-Hop Songs, number 11 on Billboard Hot Rap Songs, number 11 on Billboard Rap Airplay chart and number 2 on Billboard R&B/Hip-Hop Recurrents chart with no promotion. The visual was scheduled to film in Dominican Republic but never resumed due to Remy completely shutting down all disagreements and dehumanizing staff with brutal verbal confrontations that ultimately lead her to cut ties ending all business deals with both Record Labels.

Track listing

Charts

Weekly charts

Year-end charts

References

2006 debut albums
Remy Ma albums
Albums produced by Buckwild
Albums produced by Cool & Dre
Albums produced by Scott Storch
Albums produced by Swizz Beatz
Albums produced by the Alchemist (musician)
Albums produced by Emile Haynie
Albums produced by Agallah
Albums produced by Scram Jones
Universal Records albums